Naya  (born 11 April 1992, in Lebanon) is a Lebanese singer. She was born to the Daw (Daou) family in El Qrayeh, Lebanon. In 2009, Eli Dib introduced her to the Arabic music scene.

Recording career

2008–2009: Melody record and Batmana 
In 2008 Naya signed a recording contract with Melody Music. Her first single, "Batmanna" was released alongside a music video, directed by Fadi Haddad. Soon after her initial success, Naya and her manager, Yasser Zayed, faced legal issues. These legal issues caused her to postpone working, causing her to gradually disappear from the Arabic music scene.

2010–2011: Elie Dib Management and Arabica Music 
In November 2010, following a court decision, Naya broke her contract with Zayed. 
In March 2011, Naya released a new Khaliji song titled "Ghira." The music video was directed by Bassam Turk. 
Naya was invited to perform "Ghira" on the TV series "Hek Mnghanne" on MTV. 
In June 2011, following her performance on "Hek Menghanne" and the positive feedback of the song "Mama Ya Mama" Elie Dib and Naya decided to release the song. They obtained the rights and "Mama Ya Mama" was released in all Arab countries.

In October 2011 Naya cancelled her contract with Melody Music and signed to Arabica Music. She next released a Lebanese song named "Tezkar" Written by Mounir Abou Assaf and composed By Hisham Boulos.
On 5 November the video clip of "Tezkar", directed by Mamdouh Bayan, was released on Arabica TV.

2012–present: Mandam 
June 2012 Naya released her first album Mandam with nine Egyptian, Khaliji and Lebanese Arabic songs. Naya worked with Tamer Hosny on one song called "Bel Zouq"

During summer 2013 she released her 4th video, of "Mn Eidy". The video was different, adding many dance steps.

For the motion picture soundtrack of the Bollywood film "Dhoom-3" starring Aamir Khan, Abhishek Bachchan, Katrina Kaif and others, Naya has been roped in to sing the Arabic version of the hugely popular "Dhoom Machale" in sharp resemblance to once extremely popular Asian pop star Tata Young.

In October 2015, a video clip showed her drawing a sign similar to a cross sign in a provocative way which media and authorities in the church described it as disrespectful.

Television
Naya was in Dancing with the Stars: Raqs el Noujoum Season 1, paired with Abdo Dalloul. The judges described her as the energy of the show. On 24 February 2013, on the final show of the first series of DWTSME, she was announced as the winner.

Discography

Albums
 Mandam (2012)

Singles
"Batmana"
"Ghira"
"Tezkar"
"Mn Eidi"
"Wakhedni Hawak"
"Mandam"
"Mama Ya Mama"
"Leh Bahebak"
"Bel Zok"
"Dhoom Machale (Arabic Version)" (Dhoom 3)

Videography

References

External links

Dhoom Machale Naya Arabic version

1992 births
21st-century Lebanese women singers
Living people